The 2021 season was Djurgårdens IF's 121st in existence, their 66th season in Allsvenskan and their 21st consecutive season in the league. In addition to the Allsvenskan, they competed in the 2020-21 and 2021–22 editions of the Svenska Cupen.

Squad

Season squad

Transfers

Loans in

Loans out

Transfers in

Transfers out

Competitions

Overview

Club Friendlies

Allsvenskan

League table

Results summary

Results by round

Matches

April

May

July

August

September

October

November

December

2020–21 Svenska Cupen

Group stage

Quarter-finals

Semi-finals

2021–22 Svenska Cupen

Qualification

Statistics

Appearances

Goalscorers 

The list is sorted by shirt number when total goals are equal.

Hat-tricks

Own goals

Disciplinary 
Updated 17 January 2022The list is sorted by shirt number when total cards are equal.

Clean sheets
The list is sorted by shirt number when total clean sheets are equal.

References

Djurgårdens IF Fotboll seasons
Djurgårdens IF season